Raydah (sometimes transliterated Raidah  or al-Raidah) is a large market town located  north of Sana'a, and  north of Amran, in northwestern Yemen. In previous years, before most Yemeni Jews emigrated, the Suq al-yahud or Jewish market was held here. 

In 2009, the Jewish community numbered 266 persons. The community operates three synagogues and two schools. During the Gaza War tensions with local Muslims increased and an Islamic extremist murdered a Jewish teacher and kosher butcher, Moshe Ya'ish al-Nahari, after demanding he convert to Islam. The last time an incident of this kind occurred in Raydah was in 1986 when two Jews were killed. Following Nahari's murder, the Jewish community expressed how vulnerable they felt, and complained that they had been harassed and threatened by extremists. They requested assistance from the government. In June 2009, 16 Jewish families who resided in the town left for Israel. Nahari's wife and nine children also moved to Israel.

See also
Moshe Ya'ish al-Nahari

References

Populated places in 'Amran Governorate
Jews and Judaism in Yemen
Orthodox Jewish communities
Historic Jewish communities in Asia